Margit Danÿ (5 February 1906 – 22 January 1975) was a Hungarian fencer. She competed in the women's individual foil at the 1928 and 1932 Summer Olympics.

References

External links
 

1906 births
1975 deaths
Sportspeople from Arad, Romania
Hungarian female foil fencers
Olympic fencers of Hungary
Fencers at the 1928 Summer Olympics
Fencers at the 1932 Summer Olympics
20th-century Hungarian women